Lisa Williamson may refer to:

 Lisa Williamson, actress who played the character Dawn Cunningham in the British soap opera Hollyoaks
 Lisa Williamson (author), British writer awarded the Waterstones Children's Book Prize in the 2016 "older fiction" category 
 Lisa Williamson (One Life to Live), a fictional character in the American soap opera One Life to Live
 Sister Souljah (Lisa Williamson, born 1964), American author, rapper and activist